The Gametia are a sub-division of the Bhil community indigenous to & found in the current state of Rajasthan in India. They are known variously as Gamet or Gametia. 

The word Gametia literally means a village dweller in Rajasthani. They are said to have acquired the name because they gave up their original nomadic existence and settled as agricultural labourers. The Gametia are the largest sub-division of the Bhil of Rajasthan, and are found in the districts of Chittorgarh, Bhilwara and Udaipur. They now speak the Mewari dialect.

The Gametia are a landless community, often working in stone quarries. However, the majority of the Gametia are still landless agricultural labourers. They are Hindu and worship ancestral local deities such as Bheru.

Marriage 

Like other Bhil groups, they are endogamous. They have a greater level of distance from assimilation by Brahminical Sanskritisation.

See also 

 Bhil Kataria

References

Bhil
Scheduled Tribes of Rajasthan
Scheduled Tribes of India
Social groups of Rajasthan
Indian castes